Elysius conspersus is a moth of the family Erebidae. It was described by Francis Walker in 1855. It is found in Panama, Colombia, Venezuela, Peru, Brazil, Paraguay and Ecuador.

References

conspersus
Moths described in 1855
Moths of Central America
Moths of South America